Soizé is a commune in the Eure-et-Loir department in the Centre-Val de Loire region in northern France. It lies 3.5 kilometres from the closest small town of Authon-du-Perche. On 1 January 2019, it was merged into the commune Authon-du-Perche.

Population

See also
Communes of the Eure-et-Loir department

References

Former communes of Eure-et-Loir